Michael, Mike, or Mick Lynch may refer to:

Sport
 Michael Lynch (cyclist) (born 1963), Australian Olympic cyclist
 Michael Lynch (Gaelic footballer), Donegal goalkeeper
 Mike Lynch (outfielder) (1875–1947), outfielder for Major League Baseball
 Mike Lynch (pitcher) (1880–1927), pitcher for Major League Baseball
 Mike Lynch (rugby union) (born 1970), Irish rugby union player
 Mick Lynch (footballer) (1878–1944), Australian rules footballer

Academics 
 Michael Lynch (geneticist) (born 1951), professor of evolution, population genetics and genomics at Arizona State University
 Michael P. Lynch, professor of philosophy at the University of Connecticut
 Michael Lynch (ethnomethodologist) (born 1948), professor at the department of Science and Technology Studies at Cornell University
 Michael Lynch (historian) (born 1946), retired Scottish historian
 Mike Lynch (information scientist), professor at the University of Sheffield
 Michael Lynch (professor) (1944–1991), Canadian literature and LGBT studies academic, activist and poet

Arts 
 Michael Lynch (arts administrator) (born 1950), Australian arts administrator
 Mick Lynch (musician), Irish musician
 Mike Lynch (cartoonist) (born 1962)

Politics 
 Michael Lynch (Irish politician) (1934–2019), Fianna Fáil politician
 Mike Lynch (Colorado politician), state representative

Other
 Michael Lynch (evangelist) (born 1980), Australian pastor and evangelist
 Mick Lynch (trade unionist) (born 1962), leader of the British RMT union
 Mike Lynch (businessman) (born 1965), entrepreneur and co-founder of Autonomy Corporation
 Michael Lynch (Irish Army officer) (1942–2008), Irish Army Commandant and UN observer

See also
 Michael Lynche (born 1983), singer